Curtin Springs is a pastoral lease operating as a cattle station in the Alice Springs region of the Northern Territory of Australia.

The property shares a boundary with pastoral leases Angas Downs to the north west, Lyndavale to the south east and Mulga Park to the south. It also abuts the Katiti Aboriginal Land Trust to the west.

The land was originally known as Mount Conner Station in the 1930s when it was first taken up by Paddy DeConlay.

Abraham Andrews leased Mt Conner Station, together with vacant crown land, which became known as Curtin Springs Station around 1956, after John Curtin. Andrews originally considered the name Stalin Springs but his children felt it was inappropriate.

Curtin Springs was built in 1943 and is now owned and operated by the Severin family who took over the pastoral lease in 1956.

Peter Severin had previously worked as the head stockman on another cattle station and was gifted 1,400 head of cattle when he took over Curtin Springs for the value of the debts.

Peter Severin, his wife and young son had a lonely existence with only six visitors in the first year.
Going was tough with the family residing under a bough shed for the first three years.

By 1957, Len Tuit had begun operating return trips from Alice Springs to Uluru and was using Curtin Springs as a wayside to store fuel and water required for the return trip. This was the beginning of tourism in central Australia.

Soon the Severins installed fuel tanks to service the bus tours that had commenced from Alice Springs to Uluru and provided food and drink to tourists on board.

Later Severin acquired a liquor licence and started a pub which later became part of the restaurant.

The Curtin Springs liquor licence has not been without controversy. It has been opposed by many local Aboriginal elders and in particular the Ngaanyatjarra, Pitjantjatjara and Yankunytjatjara Women's Council, because it is considered by them to have contributed to alcohol-related violence and other social problems in nearby Aboriginal communities such as Mutitjulu, Imanpa, and Pukatja (Ernabella).
In 1988, a number of elders took an action in nuisance against Severin in the Supreme Court of the Northern Territory, but were unsuccessful.
The liquor license held by Curtin Springs is now subject to special restrictions prohibiting the supply of alcohol to any Aboriginals from the surrounding communities and anyone suspected of travelling to local communities.

Water for the station and livestock is supplied by pumping it from underground with diesel or solar pumps and windmills.
Cattle watering points are located in yards so that they may be passively mustered through the use of water trapping.

Murray Grey cattle are increasingly being used to improve the herd’s temperament and quality.
Murray Grey cattle are able to acclimatise to the desert heat better than some other breeds and their light coat colour also helps to reflect heat.
Murray Grey's also have a smaller calf size so birthing is not as risky.

Over the years the Severin family have diversified the business and now offer accommodation and other services to tourists.
The station offers a campground with a range camping sites and other accommodation

The station has a collection of birds in multiple aviaries around the homestead. All birds have been rescued after an injury or have been bread from captive animals so they are unable to be released into the wild.

Local tours include parts of the Amadeus Salt Lake Chain and Mount Conner, which is located on the private property of Curtin Springs Station.

More bushfires, started from lightning strikes ignited bushfires at the station in September 2012, the Lasseter Highway had to be closed in the area due to the resulting smoke hazard. More fires started from dry storms in October 2012 and were left to burn in areas that were inaccessible and where high winds made containment too difficult. 

The Severin family run conservative cattle numbers so they can best manage disasters such as fires and drought.

See also
List of ranches and stations
List of the largest stations in Australia

References

External links

Pastoral leases in the Northern Territory
Stations (Australian agriculture)